Artan Karapici (born 19 April 1980 in Durrës) is an Albanian retired footballer who finished his career at Tërbuni Pukë in the Albanian Superliga. Having begun his career with Erzeni Shijak in 2001, he has since played for Vllaznia Shkodër, Besa Kavajë, Partizani Tirana, KS Kamza and Kastrioti Krujë.

Club career
Karapici signed a two-year contract with KS Kamza on 5 January 2011.

References

1980 births
Living people
Footballers from Durrës
Albanian footballers
Association football midfielders
KF Erzeni players
KF Vllaznia Shkodër players
Besa Kavajë players
FK Partizani Tirana players
FC Kamza players
KS Kastrioti players
KF Adriatiku Mamurrasi players
KF Tërbuni Pukë players
Kategoria Superiore players
Kategoria e Parë players